Konstantin Ivanov may refer to:
 Konstantin Ivanov (footballer, born 1964)
 Konstantin Ivanov (poet) (1890-1915), Chuvash poet
 Konstantin Ivanov (conductor) (1907–1984), Russian conductor